Matador is an album by American jazz trumpeter Kenny Dorham featuring performances recorded in 1962 and released on the United Artists label.

Reception

Down Beat magazine jazz critic Ira Gitler stated in his April 25, 1963 review: "Dorham and McLean, two of jazz' most passionate and lyrical players are in very good form here.  Helped by a varied set of material and an energized Timmons, they have fashioned an album of surpassing interest.

The Allmusic review by Brandon Burke awarded the album 4½ stars and stated "Kenny Dorham's Matador can safely claim the all too common distinction of being a classic among jazz connoisseurs while virtually unknown to the casual listener... A fantastic session by any standard".

Track listing
 "El Matador" (Kenny Dorham) - 6:32  
 "Melanie Parts 1-3" (Jackie McLean) - 11:34  
 "Smile" (Charlie Chaplin) - 5:00  
 "Beautiful Love" (Haven Gillespie, Wayne King, Egbert Van Alstyne, Victor Young) - 5:13   
 "Prelude" (Heitor Villa-Lobos) - 4:47  
 "There Goes My Heart" (Benny Davis, Abner Silver) - 5:12

Personnel
Kenny Dorham - trumpet (except track 4)
Jackie McLean - alto saxophone (except track 5)
Bobby Timmons - piano
Teddy Smith - bass (except track 5)
J.C. Moses - drums (except track 5)

References

United Artists Records albums
Kenny Dorham albums
1962 albums
Albums produced by Alan Douglas (record producer)